Altmeyer is a surname. Notable people with the surname include:

Arthur J. Altmeyer (1891–1972), American government official
Fritz Altmeyer (1928–2013), German footballer
Jeannine Altmeyer (born 1948), American soprano 
Ralf Altmeyer (born 1966), German virologist
Theo Altmeyer (1931–2007), German classical tenor